Burak Yılmaz (born 7 February 1995) is an Austrian professional footballer who plays as a central midfielder for Turkish club Turgutluspor.

Burak is of Turkish descent.

References

External links
 

1995 births
Living people
Austrian footballers
Austria youth international footballers
Austrian people of Turkish descent
Sportspeople from Wiener Neustadt
Footballers from Lower Austria
Association football midfielders
SKN St. Pölten players
SK Austria Klagenfurt players
Austrian Football Bundesliga players